Fornacette is a town in Tuscany, central Italy, administratively a frazione of the comune of Calcinaia, province of Pisa. At the time of the 2001 census its population was 4,763.

Fornacette is about 20 km from Pisa and 4 km from Calcinaia.

References 

Frazioni of the Province of Pisa